Casey Barnes is an Australian country rock singer-songwriter from the Gold Coast, Queensland who is best known as a contestant on the seventh season of Australian Idol in 2009. Barnes won the ARIA Award for Best Country Album in 2022.

Barnes has played alongside Bryan Adams, Diesel, Mariah Carey and Lady A.

Music career
Barnes started his singing career in his state of birth of Tasmania, before relocating to the Gold Coast.

2004–08: Say What You Feel & Casey Barnes
In 2004, Barnes, who had been performing around the country for a few years, recorded his first album, titled Say What You Feel. 
 
Barnes was selected to open for Bryan Adams on his 2005 tour for A Day On the Green. Following his set, the demand for his independently released album at the merchandising tent was overwhelming, with over 200 copies selling out.

In April 2006, Barnes released "What The Hell Are You Waiting for?", the lead single from his self-titled album, Casey Barnes, which was released in August 2007. The album featured "honest, passionate music with a rock/pop edge".

In November 2007, Barnes released a duet with Connor Maclean, titled "How Good It Would Be", through Sony BMG. The song was featured on Maclean's Christmas album with all proceeds of the single and album going towards Westmead's Children's Hospital.

In 2008, Australian DJ-producer Marco Demark released a version of Elton John's "Tiny Dancer" featuring Barnes. The track peaked at number 66 in Australia.

2009: Australian Idol

In 2009, Barnes entered the seventh series of Australian Idol. He auditioned at the Brisbane auditions and made it to the semi-finals before being eliminated but received a wildcard into the top 12. In the live shows, he performed "(Baby I've Got You) On My Mind" and "I'm Not Over" but was eliminated after week two in September, placing eleventh.

2010–2015: Red Lion Motel, Jet Trails and Flesh & Bone
In May 2010, Barnes released an EP titled Red Lion Motel. and lead single "I Promise".

In January 2011, Barnes released "Never Break You" which became an anthem after the devastating Queensland floods and Cyclone Yasi. The song became his first to enter the ARIA top 50. Barnes donated all proceeds to the Premier's Disaster Relief Appeal.

In September 2012, Barnes released Jet Trails which he wrote in Nashville with Rick Price and promoted the album with shows in New York, Nashville and Los Angeles. He also performed around Australia, including the main stage of the Caloundra Music Festival.

In June 2014, Barnes released a second EP titled Flesh & Bone which was produced by Price and mixed by Grammy Award winner Jason Leaning. The EP saw the release of four singles, "Valentine", "Flesh and Bone", "Waiting on the Day" and "Hard Times". The tracks received radio airplay nationwide. The track "Waiting on the Day" touched on the sensitive subject of the loss of a child. Drawing on personal experience Barnes said "'Waiting on the Day' is a tribute to every parent who has endured the loss of a child whether that be before or after birth and the strength to face life again. This song is also for our baby Grace who we lost two years ago and will forever be in our hearts".

Later in 2014, Barnes reached the finals of two prestigious US based competitions; International Songwriting Competition and Unsigned Only.

2016–2018: Live as One and The Good Life
In July 2016, it was confirmed that Barnes had signed with Social Family Records. Barnes said, "I couldn't be more thrilled to be signing on with Social Family Records…one of the most exciting labels in the country with a strong roster of artists and their finger well and truly on the pulse with where the music industry is headed. With a brand new album coming out the timing couldn't be more perfect and I can't wait for everyone to hear what I think is my best release yet."

Barnes' fourth studio album, Live as One was released in August 2016. The album included song written with Rick Price, Michael Paynter and Michael Delorenzis. Three songs featuring his wife, Michelle Barnes. The album's title track had a video featuring well-known Australians along with national and international sporting identities holding up #LiveAsOne signs. The album's second single "Just like Magic" was released in December 2016 peaked at No. 1 on the Top 40 Country Tracks Chart and the Australian Country Radio Charts.

In June 2017, Barnes released "The Way We Ride" which became a radio favourite and peaked at No. 1 position on the Top 40 Country Tracks for 4 weeks. This song also saw Barnes nominated for his first Golden Guitar Award for Best New Talent. "Keep Me Coming Back" was released in August 2017 and also peaked at No. 1 on the Australian Top 40 Country Tracks. Barnes supported the track with the "Keep Me Coming Back Tour". In February 2018, Barnes released "Ain't Coming Home", the third single from his fourth studio album The Good Life, which was released in March 2018.

In 2017, Barnes was a finalist for Australian Male Artist of the Year and won the Media Impact Award at the Planet Country Music for a New Generation Awards.

In 2018, Barnes won Australian Male Artist of the Year at the Planet Country Music for a New Generation Awards.

2019–present: Town of a Million Dreams & Light It Up

In August 2019 Barnes confirmed he had signed with Chugg Music. Barnes' first album with the label was Town of a Million Dreams which peaked at number 16 on the ARIA Charts.

In February 2022, Barnes released Light It Up which won him his first ARIA Music Award and Country Music Award.

Discography

Studio albums

Extended plays

Singles

2000s–2010s

2020s

As featured artist

Awards and nominations

AIR Awards
The Australian Independent Record Awards (known colloquially as the AIR Awards) is an annual awards night to recognise, promote and celebrate the success of Australia's Independent Music sector.

! 
|-
| 2021
| Town of a Million Dreams
| Best Independent Country Album or EP
| 
| 
|-
| 2022
| "God Took His Time On You"
| Independent Song of the Year
|  
| 
|-
|}

APRA Awards
The APRA Awards are several award ceremonies run in Australia by the Australasian Performing Right Association (APRA) to recognise composing and song writing skills, sales and airplay performance by its members annually. 

! 
|-
| 2021 || "A Little More" || Most Performed Country Work ||  || 
|-
| 2022
| "Come Turn Me On"
| Most Performed Country Work of the Year
| 
| 
|-

ARIA Music Awards

The ARIA Music Awards is an annual awards ceremony that recognises excellence, innovation, and achievement across all genres of Australian music.

! 
|-
| 2020
| Town of a Million Dreams 
| Best Country Album 
| 
|  
|-
| 2022 || Light It Up || Best Country Album ||  ||

Country Music Awards of Australia
The Country Music Awards of Australia is an annual awards night held in January during the Tamworth Country Music Festival. Celebrating recording excellence in the Australian country music industry. They commenced in 1973.
 

! 
|-
| 2018 || Casey Barnes || Best New Talent ||   || 
|-
| 2020 || Casey Barnes ("A Little More") || Best New Talent ||  || 
|-
|rowspan="4"|  2021 || Town of a Million Dreams || Album of the Year ||  ||rowspan="4"| 
|-
| Town of a Million Dreams || Contemporary Country Album of the Year ||   
|-
| Casey Barnes || Male Artist of the Year ||   
|-
| "No Other You" (with Missy Lancaste) || Vocal Collaboration of the Year ||   
|-
|rowspan="2"|  2022 || "God Took His Time On You" || Single of the Year ||  ||rowspan="2"|
|-
| Casey Barnes || Male Artist of the Year ||   
|-
|rowspan="6"| 2023 || "Get to Know Ya"|| Single of the Year ||  ||rowspan="5"| 
|-
| "Get to Know Ya" (Written by Casey Barnes, Michael DeLorenzis and Michael Paynter) || Song of the Year || 
|-
| Casey Barnes || Male Artist of the Year || 
|-
| Light It Up || Contemporary Country Album of the Year || 
|-
| Light It Up || Album of the Year || 
|-
| Light It Up || Top Selling Album of the Year ||  || 
|-

Gold Coast Music Awards 
The Gold Coast Music Awards are an annual awards ceremony that recognises musicians from the Gold Coast area.

! 
|-
| 2015
| 
| People's Choice
| 
|  
|-
| 2020
| Casey Barnes
| Artist of the year
| 
|  
|-
| 2021
| Casey Barnes
| Artist of the year
| 
|  
|-
| rowspan="2"| 2022
| Casey Barnes
| Artist of the year
| 
| rowspan="2"|
|-
| Casey Barnes
| Hall of Fame
| 
|-

Queensland Music Awards
The Queensland Music Awards (previously known as Q Song Awards) are annual awards celebrating Queensland, Australia's brightest emerging artists and established legends. They commenced in 2006.

 (wins only)
! 
|-
! scope="row"| 2022
| "God Took His Time On You"
| Country Song of the Year
| 
| rowspan="2"| 
|}

References

External links
 

1978 births
ARIA Award winners
Australian male singer-songwriters
Australian Idol participants
Living people
Musicians from Gold Coast, Queensland
Musicians from Tasmania